Spinatus muscle may refer to:

 Infraspinatus muscle
 Supraspinatus muscle